Honeyia is a genus of moths of the family Erebidae. The genus was erected by Hermann Heinrich Hacker and Michael Fibiger in 2007.

Species
Honeyia burmeisteri Hacker & Fibiger, 2007 
Honeyia clearchus (Fawcett, 1916) 
Honeyia dia (Viette, 1972) 
Honeyia quarta Hacker & Fibiger, 2007 
Honeyia secunda Hacker & Fibiger, 2007 
Honeyia tertia Hacker & Fibiger, 2007

References

 Hacker, H. H. & Fibiger, M. (2007). "Revision of the African species of the genus Brevipecten Hampson, 1894, with description of the genus Honeyia gen. nov. (Lepidoptera, Noctuidae)". Esperiana Memoir. 3: 247–332, pls. 31–42.
 
 

Erebidae
Noctuoidea genera